The Order of Saint Elizabeth was an all-female chivalric and charitable order in the Kingdom of Bavaria. The following excerpt is from The Orders of Knighthood, British and Foreign (1884):

History
The first Consort of the Elector Charles Theodore of the Palatinate, Elizabeth Augusta, daughter of the Palatine Joseph Charles Emanuel of Schultzbach, founded this Order for ladies in honor of her sainted patroness and namesake on 18 October 1766, as a purely charitable institution for the poor. It was confirmed on 31 January 1767, by Pope Clement XII, and endowed with various indulgencies. The Catholic religion and the Seize Quartiers – the proof of noble descent running through sixteen generations of their own or their husband’s ancestors – are indispensable conditions for candidates.  The Grand Mistress is, however, empowered to nominate and unlimited number of ladies, from Princely Houses and her own Court, as also six other married or widowed ladies of noble, but not ancient descent. The nomination takes place either on Easter or on Saint Elizabeth’s Day (19 November). The entrance fee is four ducats.  The badge is a white enameled cross, representing on one side Saint Elizabeth dispensing charity to the poor, and on the other, the initials of the founder. It is worn on the left breast by a blue ribbon with a red border. No Member can appear in public without it, except by fine of one ducat. The King appoints the Grand Mistress.

Members
Archduchess Marie Valerie of Austria
Archduchess Gisela of Austria
 Empress Amélie of Leuchtenberg
 Empress Augusta Victoria of Schleswig-Holstein
Princess Maria Elisabeth of Bavaria
Princess Marie of Hohenzollern-Sigmaringen; 1900: Wedding Gift in honour of her son.
Princess Joséphine Caroline of Belgium; 1900: Wedding Gift in honour of her brother.
Princess Henriette of Belgium; 1900: Wedding Gift in honour of her brother.
Princess Isabella Antonie of Croÿ
Princess Louise of Orléans
Princess Maria di Grazia of Bourbon-Two Sicilies
Infanta Maria Teresa of Spain
Infanta Amelia Philippina of Spain
Princess Eugénie de Leuchtenberg

Sources

  Tagore, Rajah Sir Sourindro Mohun. The Orders of Knighthood, British and Foreign. Calcutta, India: The Catholic Orphan Press, 1884

References

External links

Saint Elizabeth, Order of
Saint Elizabeth, Order of
Saint Elizabeth, Order of
Saint Elizabeth, Order of
1766 establishments in the Holy Roman Empire
18th-century establishments in Bavaria
Awards established in 1766